The long-haired fruit bat (Stenonycteris lanosus), also known as the long-haired rousette, is a species of megabat in the family Pteropodidae. It is the only member of the genus Stenonycteris. It was formerly classified in the genus Rousettus until a 2013 phylogenetic study found it to belong to its own genus and tribe.

It is native to the Democratic Republic of the Congo, Ethiopia, Kenya, Malawi, Rwanda, South Sudan, Tanzania, and Uganda. Its natural habitat is subtropical or tropical moist montane forests.

References

Megabats
Bats of Africa
Fauna of East Africa
Mammals described in 1906
Taxonomy articles created by Polbot
Taxa named by Oldfield Thomas
Taxobox binomials not recognized by IUCN